William Ewing Cooper Jr. (born 19 June 1929) is a retired major general in the United States Army who served as Deputy Director for Foreign Intelligence at the Defense Intelligence Agency. He was commissioned through ROTC at The Citadel in 1951, graduating with a B.A. degree in history. Cooper also holds an M.A. degree in history from the University of Miami and an M.A. degree in international affairs from Georgetown University. He is a 1962 graduate of the Army Command and General Staff College and a 1964 graduate of the Defense Intelligence School.

References

1929 births
Living people
The Citadel, The Military College of South Carolina alumni
Military personnel from Birmingham, Alabama
United States Army personnel of the Korean War
University of Miami alumni
United States Army personnel of the Vietnam War
Recipients of the Air Medal
Recipients of the Meritorious Service Medal (United States)
Georgetown University alumni
Recipients of the Legion of Merit
United States Army generals
Recipients of the Defense Superior Service Medal